Mutnovsky is a complex volcano located in the southern part of Kamchatka Peninsula, Russia. It is one of the most active volcanoes of southern Kamchatka; the latest eruption was recorded in 2000. At the foot of the Mutnovsky lies a geyser field, popularly known as the Lesser Valley of Geysers.

See also
 List of volcanoes in Russia
 List of ultra prominent peaks in Northeast Asia
 Geothermal power in Russia

References

Sources

 
 

Mountains of the Kamchatka Peninsula
Volcanoes of the Kamchatka Peninsula
Active volcanoes
Complex volcanoes